Strømm is a former municipality in Vestfold county, Norway.

Separation
The parish of Hurum was divided into two formannskapsdistrikt on January 1, 1838. The main part of the parish belonged to the county of Buskerud, while the annex Strømmen belonged to the county of Vestfold. The border between the two counties followed the fjord of Drammensfjord.

The town of Svelvik was separated from Strømm as a municipality of its own in 1845 - but these two municipalities were again merged to one January 1, 1964.

Population
Strømm had a population of 794 in 1838. Prior to the merger of 1964 Strømm had a population of 2,618.

The name 
The municipality (originally the annex) is named after the old farm Strømmen (Norse Straumr), since the first church was built there. The name is identical with the word straumr  'stream' (referring to the strong stream in the narrow sound between Svelvik and Hurum).

The name was changed from Strømmen to Strømm in 1918.

References 

Former municipalities of Norway
Svelvik